Transport in São Paulo plays a key role in the daily lives of the people of São Paulo and offers various methods of public transport that are offered in the city, including a complex bus system run by SPTrans, and various subway and railway lines. A contactless smartcard is used to pay fares for the buses, subway, and railway systems. São Paulo also has three airports.

Bus system

Over 16,000 buses form the bulk of the public transport in São Paulo; including about 290 trolley buses. With the exception of a small network overseen by the EMTU, all bus lines are operated by concessionaires under the supervision of SPTrans, a municipal company responsible for the planning and management of public transport. The SPTrans buses are painted with region-specific colours and carry about 8,8 million people daily. Until 2003, informal transport vans had a large presence in the city, but the vast majority are now registered with the city council, legalised, and now operate under the same colour scheme used in the main system. To increase efficiency in the city, São Paulo implemented in 2007 a bus rapid transit system called the Expresso Tiradentes.

Rail transport

The network transports about 8,3 million people daily and it is operated by four different companies. Two are state-owned: São Paulo Metro and the Companhia Paulista de Trens Metropolitanos (CPTM). The other two are private: ViaQuatro, which operates Line 4 - Yellow ; and ViaMobilidade, which operates Line 5 - Lilac and the future Line 17 - Gold.

Connections between the lines operated by different companies are usually free, with the only two exceptions being Tatuapé and Corinthians-Itaquera stations, where connections are paid during rush-hours and free during other periods.

There are currently 4 lines operated by the São Paulo Metro Company and 2 under construction:

Line 1 (Blue): The first Metrô line built. The line connects the North and the South Side of São Paulo. Connections are available for the Green, Red, Yellow, and Lilac lines, and also CPTM trains. The line serves Tietê and Jabaquara bus terminals.
Line 2 (Green): Transverses the Avenida Paulista ridge, connecting Vila Prudente to Vila Madalena, and connects to the Blue, Yellow, and Lilac metro lines, as well as to the Silver monorail line. It also provides connections to CPTM trains.
Line 3 (Red): One of São Paulo's busiest lines and connects the East Side to the West Side. Connections to the Blue and Yellow lines are possible, as are with CPTM and ViaMobilidade trains. The Barra Funda bus terminal is located on this line.
Line 6 (Orange) (under construction): Announced in 2008, with construction initiated in 2015, the Orange Line will connect the district of Freguesia do Ó, in the Northwestern side of the city to downtown São Paulo. Connections to the Blue and Yellow lines will be possible, and also with the CPTM and ViaMobilidade trains. As of January 2022, the construction is ongoing and the opening is scheduled for September 2026.
Line 15 (Silver): This is the first high-capacity monorail line in the country. It runs east from Vila Prudente station, where it connects to the Green metro line. As of December 2021, eleven stations are open and an expansion to Cidade Tiradentes and Ipiranga is under development.
Line 17 (Gold) (under construction): Monorail line that will connect Morumbi station with the Congonhas Airport. Connection with the Lilac line will be possible, and also to the ViaMobilidade train service. As of April 2021, the line is expected to open in April 2023. Further expansion to this line is expected as plans to expand it are under development. The expansion will span westward, crossing the Pinheiros River and connecting to the Yellow Line, and eastward, connecting to the Blue line. Operation of this line will be contracted out to ViaMobilidade.

The following line is operated by ViaQuatro:
Line 4 (Yellow): Connects the central Luz station to the West and South Sides in a route constructed immediately below the Consolação and Rebouças avenues. Connections are available to the Blue, Green and Red lines and to ViaMobilidade trains. Operation of this line is contracted out to ViaQuatro for 30 years, which is renewable for another 30 years.

There are three lines operated by ViaMobilidade:
Line 5 (Lilac): Connects the South Side of São Paulo to the Blue and Green lines and to ViaMobilidade trains. It will be the only metro line to connect to the Gold monorail line after it opens in 2022. As of February 2019, plans of expanding the line north to Ipiranga and south to Jardim Ângela are under development. Operation of this line is contracted out to ViaMobilidade.
Line 8 (Diamond): Formerly part of the old trunk line of the Estrada de Ferro Sorocabana, it connects the Júlio Prestes station downtown to Itapevi, going across the western side of the city. An operational extension with another train links this line to two more stations in Itapevi. The last station (Amador Bueno) is placed near the border with São Roque. The Júlio Prestes station houses the State of the Art concert hall Sala São Paulo. This line was formerly operated by CPTM.
Line 9 (Emerald): Formerly part of the Jurubatuba Branch of the Estrada de Ferro Sorocabana, is located along the Nações Unidas Avenue (Marginal Pinheiros), and connects the region of the Interlagos Speedway to the neighbouring city of Osasco. This line was formerly operated by CPTM.

There are five lines operated by CPTM:

Line 7 (Ruby): Formerly the northern part of the old São Paulo Railway, Line 7 connects the Brás station (weekdays only, on weekends, has its terminal in Luz) downtown to the city of Francisco Morato, crossing all of the northwestern side of the city. An operational extension connects Francisco Morato to the city of Jundiaí. This is the longest line of the railway system in São Paulo.
Line 10 (Turquoise): Formerly the southern part of the old São Paulo Railway, it is actually a continuation of the Line 7 - Ruby, and crosses the ABC Region.
Line 11 (Coral): Formerly part of the São Paulo Branch of the Estrada de Ferro Central do Brasil, once known as "Expresso Leste" (East Express), crosses all the eastern side of São Paulo from downtown to the campus of the Universidade de Mogi das Cruzes, in the city of Mogi das Cruzes. The largest distance between two stations (between Tatuapé and Itaquera) of all the railway network is found on Line 11.
Line 12 (Sapphire): Formerly known as the Variant of Poá of the Estrada de Ferro Central do Brasil, it crosses the northeastern side of São Paulo, from the Brás station in downtown to the city of Itaquaquecetuba.
Line 13 (Jade): First line completely built by CPTM, connects Engenheiro Goulart station to São Paulo–Guarulhos International Airport (GRU).

São Paulo had tram lines during the first half of the 20th century, but they were eradicated following the expansion of the bus system.

Proposed regional rail

A four-line regional rail network linking São Paulo with other cities in the State of São Paulo using CPTM, cargo and new tracks is planned but on hold following the Brazilian financial crisis.

Public Transportation Statistics
The average amount of time people spend commuting with public transit in São Paulo, for example to and from work, on a weekday is 93 min. 30% of public transit riders, ride for more than 2 hours every day. The average amount of time people wait at a stop or station for public transit (including buses) is 19 min, while 35% of riders wait for over 20 minutes on average every day.

Airfare

Airports 

São Paulo has three airports. Two of them, São Paulo/Guarulhos International Airport and Congonhas-São Paulo Airport are located in the metropolitan area, while the third, Campo de Marte, is located north of the city center. Campo de Marte also hosts the Ventura Goodyear Blimp.

Congonhas Airport operates domestic and regional flights, mainly to Rio de Janeiro, Belo Horizonte and Brasília. Guarulhos International Airport, also known to São Paulo locals as "Cumbica", is located  North East of the city center, in the neighbouring city of Guarulhos. Guarulhos airport operates both domestic and international flights. Major Brazilian airlines handled by Congonhas Airport and Guarulhos Airport include TAM Airlines, Gol Transportes Aéreos, and Azul Brazilian Airlines. Campo de Marte airport handles some private and small-sized airplanes.

In 2006, about 34.3 million people used the city's airports (mainly from Congonhas and Guarulhos International Airport, the only two operating commercial flights). Infraero, Brazil's main aviation authority, estimates that with the remodelling of Guarulhos Airport, São Paulo's airports will be able to handle about 45 million passengers a year within the next five years.

Additionally São Paulo Catarina Executive Airport located in São Roque, opened in 2019 handles general aviation traffic.

Heliports
São Paulo has the largest fleet of helicopters in the world, with around 500 registered helicopters and 700 flights per day in the city. The owners are an elite wealthy class who take advantage of approximately one hundred helipads and heliports to conveniently avoid heavy traffic. In addition, there are many air taxi companies in the city, used mostly by the upper class to travel between São Paulo and Rio de Janeiro.

Motorways

Roads

Many Brazilian highways pass through or start in São Paulo itself, including the BR-116, Rodovia dos Bandeirantes, Rodovia Raposo Tavares, the Rodovia Anhangüera, Rodovia dos Imigrantes, Rodovia Castelo Branco, and Via Dutra.

Rodoanel

The Rodoanel Mario Covas (SP-21) (also known as Rodoanel Metropolitano de São Paulo or simply Rodoanel) is a motorway being built around the center of the metropolitan region of São Paulo in an attempt to alleviate traffic intensity of trucks along the city's two riverside highways (Pinheiros and Tietê).

The Rodoanel is being constructed as a multi-lane, limited-access freeway, with large sections to be built in unoccupied regions: along the edge of forests, close to residential areas, etc. This is in an effort to prevent squatting and development in environmentally sensitive areas along the route. Construction is being carried out in four phases: west, south, east and north. As of mid-2010, the west and south section have been completed. The beginning of construction on the east section is planned for February 2011. Due to the rougher terrain and environmental concerns, there is no projected date for the initiation of construction on the northern section.

Travel restrictions

Similar to the Hoy No Circula program in Mexico, São Paulo has implemented restrictions on travel to maintain the quality of air. Drivers must respect a certain schedule according to the last digit of their car's license plate number.

Interconnected roads

References

Further reading